Kamba language (Kenya)

Kamba may also refer to:
Kaamba language (Congo)
Kamba language (New Guinea)
 an alternative name for Chiriguano Guarani
 Kamba people of Brazil, who identify as and speak Chiquitano

See also 
 Kamba (disambiguation)